Alfred M. Wood (April 19, 1825 – July 28, 1895) was an officer in the Union Army during the American Civil War.

On April 13, 1858, Wood was commissioned as colonel of the 14th New York Militia (14th Brooklyn), a local antebellum militia regiment.

When the Civil War erupted, Wood enlisted at the age of 35 on April 4, 1861, in Brooklyn, New York, to serve three years.  He was wounded and captured on July 21, 1861, at the First Battle of Manassas, also known as the First Battle of Bull Run, exchanged for a Confederate colonel and returned to field duty.  Because of his wounds received at the battle of First Bull Run he was discharged for disability on October 18, 1861.  After the war Alfred Wood became very involved in the post war affairs of his beloved 14th Brooklyn helping the veterans of the unit.  He also became Mayor of Brooklyn, 1864–1865.

References
 The History of the Fighting Fourteenth by Tevis & Marquis.
 Colonel Alfred M. Wood -14th Brooklyn

External links
 
 Brooklyn Standard, March 8, 1862, Library of Congress, reporting on Col. Wood's return from Richmond.
 Brooklyn Standard, March 8, 1862, Library of Congress, reporting, from February 24, 1862, that that Brooklyn Board of Aldermen approved a group to meet and escort Colonel Wood to Brooklyn.

Union Army colonels
American Civil War prisoners of war
People of New York (state) in the American Civil War
Eastern Iron Brigade
Mayors of Brooklyn
1825 births
1895 deaths
19th-century American politicians